Aşağı Qobuüstü (known as Yeniarx until 2015) is a village in the Agdash Rayon of Azerbaijan. The village forms part of the municipality of Qobuüstü.

References 

Populated places in Agdash District